Roberts and Mander Stove Company Buildings is a historic factory complex located at Hatboro, Montgomery County, Pennsylvania. The complex consists of six contributing buildings and one contributing structure.  They are the Foundry Building (c. 1915, c. 1960), Main Manufacturing Building (1915-1944), Gate House (c. 1925), Transformer House (c. 1925), Smelter (c. 1925), Garage (c. 1925), and water tank.  The buildings are 1 1/2-story, brick structures with flat roofs and large window openings.  The Roberts and Mander Stove Company acquired the existing Hatboro Foundry buildings in 1918, and operated until 1950. 

It was added to the National Register of Historic Places in 2005. A portion of the complex has been converted into apartment homes called the Hatboro Lofts. The water tank was torn down in November 2017.

References

External links

Industrial buildings and structures on the National Register of Historic Places in Pennsylvania
Industrial buildings completed in 1915
Industrial buildings completed in 1925
Energy infrastructure completed in 1925
Buildings and structures in Montgomery County, Pennsylvania
National Register of Historic Places in Montgomery County, Pennsylvania